Motoyoshi (written: 基義, 基吉 or 元良) is a masculine Japanese given name. Notable people with the name include:

, Japanese poet and nobleman
, Japanese film director
, pen name of Shimizu Motoyoshi, Japanese writer and poet

Motoyoshi (written: 本吉) is also a Japanese surname. Notable people with the surname include:
, Japanese footballer

Japanese-language surnames
Japanese masculine given names